William Marshall Dunn (9 October 1910 – 7 September 1980) was a Scottish professional footballer who played at centre forward for  Celtic, Brentford and Southampton in the 1930s.

Football career
Dunn was born in the Lambhill district of Glasgow, one of a family of 9 footballing brothers. After playing for Newton Villa and Ashfield, he joined Celtic in February 1933. Having been a prolific scorer in junior football, he continued to score for the reserves, with 51 goals in just over two years, but was unable to carry this form into the first team. He made his first-team debut in a 1–1 draw at St Johnstone on 23 September 1933, and played nine first team games for Celtic, with two goals.

In the summer of 1935, he moved south to join Brentford of the Football League First Division. He was again a prolific scorer in the reserves but only managed one goal in his three first-team matches before he was transferred to Southampton in May 1937.

On his arrival at The Dell, the local newspaper praised "his skill and marksmanship". At the start of the 1937–38 season, he took over the centre forward position previously held by Jimmy Dunne, who had returned to his native Ireland in the summer. His debut came in the opening match of the season, when he scored in a 4–3 defeat at Norwich City. He retained the number 9 shirt for the first nine matches of the season without scoring again and in October he was replaced by Benny Gaughran. Dunn spent most of the rest of the season in the reserves, making only six more first-team appearances, with three more goals.

At the end of the season, he refused a new contract and was transfer listed for a fee of £750. He eventually moved back to Scotland to join Raith Rovers, where he had a spell on loan to Bo'ness.

During the Second World War, he made a guest appearance at left back for Leeds United in a 7–2 victory over Newcastle United in January 1943.

References

External links
Career details on www.11v11.com

1910 births
1980 deaths
Footballers from Glasgow
Scottish footballers
Ashfield F.C. players
Celtic F.C. players
Brentford F.C. players
Southampton F.C. players
Raith Rovers F.C. players
Bo'ness F.C. players
Dumbarton F.C. wartime guest players
Leeds United F.C. wartime guest players
English Football League players
Scottish Football League players
Association football forwards
Scottish Junior Football Association players
Albion Rovers F.C. wartime guest players